Puerto Rico Highway 208 (PR-208) is a proposed bypass to be located north of downtown Aguas Buenas, Puerto Rico. When completed, it will extend from PR-156 west of downtown to return again to PR-156 in the east of the municipality center.

Major intersections

See also

 List of highways numbered 208

References

External links
 

208
Aguas Buenas, Puerto Rico